Richard Anthony "Rich" Costello (born June 27, 1963) is a retired American professional ice hockey player. He played 12 games in the National Hockey League with the Toronto Maple Leafs between1984 and 1986. The rest of his career, which lasted from 1983 to 1991, was mainly spent in the minor legaues.

Biography
As a youth, Costello played in the 1976 Quebec International Pee-Wee Hockey Tournament with a minor ice hockey team from Boston.

He was drafted by the Philadelphia Flyers in 1981 NHL Entry Draft, but traded to the Toronto Maple Leafs in 1982 for Darryl Sittler. Costello was born in Framingham, Massachusetts, but grew up in Natick, Massachusetts.

Costello spent part of the 1983-84 season with the United States National Team. He spent the following three years in the Leafs organisation, in which he played a total of 12 games in the NHL, but spent most of his time in the American Hockey League. He later played professionally in Finland, Germany and Switzerland.

Career statistics

Regular season and playoffs

References

External links
 

1963 births
Living people
Albany Choppers players
American expatriate ice hockey players in Germany
American men's ice hockey centers
HC Davos players
Ice hockey players from Massachusetts
Newmarket Saints players
People from Natick, Massachusetts
Philadelphia Flyers draft picks
Providence Friars men's ice hockey players
Ratingen EC players
SaiPa players
St. Catharines Saints players
Schwenningen ERC players
Sportspeople from Framingham, Massachusetts
Sportspeople from Middlesex County, Massachusetts
Toronto Maple Leafs players
Utica Devils players
American expatriate ice hockey players in Canada
American expatriate ice hockey players in Finland
American expatriate ice hockey players in Switzerland